Ken Nielsen (born May 10, 1942 in Hanna, Alberta) is a former wide receiver for the Winnipeg Blue Bombers from 1965 to 1970. Nielsen won the CFL's Most Outstanding Canadian Award in 1968.

College Football
Ken Nielsen played Canadian university football at the University of Alberta.

Winnipeg
Though drafted by the Hamilton Tiger-Cats, Ken Nielsen was traded that same year to Winnipeg. Ken Nielsen became a standout wide receiver for the Winnipeg Blue Bombers from 1965 to 1970. In the 1965 Western conference playoffs, Nielsen caught a 109-yard touchdown pass from Ken Ploen which beat the Calgary Stampeders and helped send Winnipeg to the 53rd Grey Cup game. But the Blue Bombers lost that game to the Hamilton Tiger-Cats, the so-called "Wind Bowl", when weather conditions were terrible for passing, punting, and place kicking.

During training camp in 1970, after only five seasons, Nielsen suffered a serious neck injury which cut short his career. He caught 280 passes for 4,340 yards.

After football
Nielsen is a retired dentist now living in Kelowna, BC. He has four children and thirteen grandchildren.

External links
Career bio

1942 births
Living people
People from Hanna, Alberta
Alberta Golden Bears football players
Canadian Football League Most Outstanding Canadian Award winners
Canadian football wide receivers
Hamilton Tiger-Cats players
Players of Canadian football from Alberta
Winnipeg Blue Bombers players